12th of Never may refer to:

 12th of Never (novel), a 2013 novel by James Patterson
 "The Twelfth of Never", a song by Johnny Mathis
 Twelfth of Never, an idiom of improbability